Marathukali is a variant of Poorakkali. Poorakkali is a traditional dance ritual performed by men during the nine-day Pooram festival in Bhagavathy temples across Northern Kerala (formerly known as Kolathunadu), south India. Marathukali is a form of Poorakali performed by two parties competently. The ordinary play lacks the competent mood displayed in Marathukali. Big disputes ensue between two parties while performance is on and learned people dissuade both parties from further confrontation.

See also
 Arts of Kerala
 Kerala Folklore Academy
 Poorakkali

Dances of Kerala